Arthur Henrique may refer to:

 Arthur Henrique (footballer, born 1987), Brazilian football left-back for Gżira United
 Arthur Henrique (footballer, born 1994), Brazilian football left-back for Atlético Goianiense
 Arthur Henrique (footballer, born 1997), Brazilian football goalkeeper for CRB